Slavín is a memorial monument and military cemetery in Bratislava, Slovakia. 

Slavin may also refer to:

 Slavin (name), including a list of people with the surname and given name
 Slavín (Prague), a tomb at the Vyšehrad Cemetery, Czech Republic

See also
Slaving
Slavena
 Rad Slavin cis. 112 Z.C.B.J. Hall, a historic building in Comstock, Nebraska, U.S.